Čepigovo is a village in Municipality of Prilep, North Macedonia.

Geography and location 
The village is located in Prilep valley, of the broader Pelagonia valley, located 22.5 km southwest of Prilep.

History 
Close to the village are the remains of the ancient city of Stibera, which existed from the 3rd century BC, until the 3rd century AD.

The village is mentioned in the Turkish census books from 1467/68, as part of the Vilayet-I Prilepe, under the name Čapugo, where 50 families and 2 unmarried men lived, all Christians.

It used to be part of the former municipality of Topolčani.

Demographics
According to the 2002 census, the village had a total of 162 inhabitants.

Ethnic groups in the village include:

Macedonians 160
Others 2
The following table is a summary of the demographics 1900-2002:

Families 
All of the families have settled from elsewhere:

Debresliovci, settled from Debrešte in the 19th century; Bilevci, and Rtovci, formerly a single family, settled in the 19th century from the village of Poeševo, near Bitola; Marijovci, settled from a village in Mariovo; Belocrkvanci, settled after 1912 from the village of Bela Crkva, there they were named Prčkovci; Ilinci, settled from Ilino (Golemo or Malo); and Smilevci, settled from Babino, near Demir Hisar.

References

Villages in Prilep Municipality